Charles Bergonzi (24 July 1910 – 23 January 1986) was a Monegasque sports shooter. He competed in the 25 m pistol event at the 1952 Summer Olympics.

References

1910 births
1986 deaths
Monegasque male sport shooters
Olympic shooters of Monaco
Shooters at the 1952 Summer Olympics
Place of birth missing